Thelomma santessonii, the tan nipple lichen, is a species of saxicolous (rock-dwelling), crustose lichen in the family Caliciaceae. Found in northern North America, it was formally described as a new species in 1976 by lichenologist Leif Tibell. It is endemic to the coast and islands of Southern California and Baja California in Mexico.

Thelomma santessonii has a yellowish tan color, and is areolate. The thallus has  that measure up to  broad. When a long-wavelength UV light is lit on the thallus, it fluoresces a blue-white color. The ascospores of the lichen are spherical and lack any septa; they measure 14–16 μm.

Endococcus thelommatis is a lichenicolous fungus that parasitizes Thelomma santessonii.

References

Caliciales
Lichen species
Lichens described in 1976
Lichens of the Southwestern United States
Lichens of Mexico
Taxa named by Leif Tibell